The National Orchid Garden, located within the Singapore Botanic Gardens, was opened on 20 October 1995 by Senior Minister Lee Kuan Yew.

The National Orchid Garden is located in the Central Core of the gardens.

See also
Singapore Botanic Gardens
List of parks in Singapore

References

External links
Singapore Botanic Gardens
National Parks Board, Singapore
National Orchid Garden, Singapore

1995 establishments in Singapore
Parks in Singapore